Ode to John Law is the second studio album by Scottish band Stone the Crows.

Track listing

Personnel
Stone the Crows
Colin Allen – drums, percussion
Maggie Bell – vocals
Jimmy Dewar – bass, vocals
Les Harvey – acoustic and electric guitars
John McGinnis – organ, piano, keyboards
 
Additional personnel
Peter Grant – executive producer
David Juniper - album design
Mark London- producer
Eddie Offord – engineering
Leo Sauer - front cover painting

References

1970 albums
Polydor Records albums
Stone the Crows albums